Gregory Russell Pryor (born October 2, 1949), is a former Major League Baseball infielder. He played all or part of ten seasons in the majors, in 1976 and 1978–1986.
He was 6'0 feet tall and weighed 185 pounds. He batted right and threw right handed.

https://lifepriority.com

https://thedaytheyankeesmademeshave.com

Major league career 
Originally drafted by the Washington Senators, Pryor was picked in the 6th round of the 1971 amateur draft (130th overall) and was the last position player draft pick of the Senators to play in the major leagues.

Greg's father, George, was a fullback at Wake Forest University and played for the Baltimore Colts of the NFL.

References

External links

Greg Pryor at Baseball Almanac

1949 births
Living people
Major League Baseball infielders
Texas Rangers players
Chicago White Sox players
Florida Southern Moccasins baseball players
Kansas City Royals players
Rocky Mount Phillies players
Baseball players from Ohio
Sportspeople from Marietta, Ohio
Burlington Rangers players
Geneva Senators players
Pittsfield Rangers players
Sacramento Solons players
Spokane Indians players
Syracuse Chiefs players